John Harrison (born 1942) is an American ice cream taster, who worked for ice cream company Dreyer's (also known as Edy's) as its "Official Taste Tester".

Career
Harrison joined Dreyer's in 1956, serving until his retirement in 2010. He tasted an average of sixty ice cream flavors on a daily basis. Harrison does not consume the ice cream, and instead spits it out. Based on his own estimates, he has tasted a few hundred million gallons of ice cream at Dreyer's. He has aided in the creation of more than one hundred unique ice cream flavors; he claims that he invented the flavor Cookies n' Cream. According to a World report on Harrison, "his taste buds are so fine-tuned he can immediately taste the difference between 12-percent and 11.5-percent butterfat in a product." The report also described him as the "most popular ice cream man in America". Harrison believes himself to be "the first national spokesman on ice cream". He has appeared on many television programs, as well as on other media. In 1997, Harrison was awarded the American Tasting Institute's Master Taster of the Year title.

Personal life
Born in 1942, all of Harrison's paternal family, up to his great grandfather, were involved in the ice cream industry in one way or another. In his younger days, he would help out at the ice cream factory his uncle owned. Harrison is married and currently resides in Palm Desert, California. Harrison's taste buds are insured for a million dollars. He adheres to a very strict diet, so as not to affect his tasting skills.

References

1942 births
Living people
People from Palm Desert, California